Joseph Howard Berry, Sr. (September 20, 1872 – March 13, 1961) was an American baseball player who appeared in one Major League Baseball game with the Philadelphia Phillies in . He was a switch hitter and threw right-handed.

Berry's son, Joseph Howard Berry, Jr., had a brief career with the New York Giants from 1921 to 1922.

External links

1872 births
1961 deaths
Major League Baseball catchers
Baseball players from West Virginia
Philadelphia Phillies players
Sportspeople from Wheeling, West Virginia
Poughkeepsie Bridge Citys players
Youngstown Puddlers players
Auburn Maroons players
Schenectady Electricians players
Bristol Bell Makers players
Springfield Ponies players
Haverhill Hustlers players
Minor league baseball managers